Going Off on One is the second live album released by the international progressive rock group The Tangent. It was released as a double CD/single DVD format (available separately), but also as a limited special edition, containing both CDs and the DVD, plus a deluxe digipack cover with enhanced artwork and extended booklet.

Track listing
Songs that appear on the DVD were recorded live at Club Riga, England, in September 2006. Tracks 10-13 (disc two's first four tracks) were recorded on May 1, 2005 at RoSfest, at The Colonial Theater, Phoenixville, PA. "America" is the "missing piece" from the show recorded and released as Pyramids and Stars.

Disc one

Disc two

The DVD contains extras featuring a 1981 concert by Andy's band "A New Opera" (with Lindsay Frost, David Million, David Albone, and Simon Albone). There is also Tangent rehearsal footage show on a single video camera at Mushroom Studios in Rayleigh, Essex.

DVD version
 "GPS Culture"
 "The Winning Game"
 "In Earnest"
 "Forsaken Cathedrals"
 "The Music That Died Alone"
 "Lost in London"
 "In Darkest Dreams Part 1"
 "After Rubycon"
 "In Darkest Dreams Part 2"

Personnel 
 Andy Tillison - Lead vocals and keyboards
 Sam Baine - Keyboards and vocals
 Krister Jonsson - Electric guitar
 Guy Manning - Acoustic guitar, percussion and vocals
 Jonas Reingold - Bass guitar
 Jaime Salazar - Drums
 Theo Travis - Saxophone and flute
 Roine Stolt - guitar on "America"
 Zoltan Csörsz - drums on "America"
 Ed Unitsky - Album artwork
 Martin Kornick - Album artwork

References 

The Tangent albums
2007 live albums
2007 video albums
Live video albums
Inside Out Music live albums